Arbroath railway station can refer to one of several railway stations in the town of Arbroath, Scotland — only the one now named simply Arbroath railway station is still in existence:

Open 
 Arbroath railway station on the link line

Closed 
 Arbroath Catherine Street: Terminus of the Arbroath and Forfar Railway
 Arbroath Lady Loan: Terminus of the Dundee and Arbroath Railway (also known as Arbroath West)

Sources
 
 
 

Railway stations in Angus, Scotland
Arbroath